Manawatū District is a territorial authority district in the Manawatū-Whanganui local government region in the North Island of New Zealand, administered by Manawatū District Council. It includes most of the area between the Manawatū River in the south and the Rangitīkei River in the north, stretching from slightly south of the settlement of Himatangi in the south, to just south of Mangaweka in the north, and from the Rangitīkei River to the top of the Ruahine Range in the east. It does not include the Foxton area and the mouth of the Manawatū River, or Palmerston North City (which includes Ashhurst). Its main town is Feilding. The district has an area of 2,624 km².

Name and geography
Manawatū is said to have been named by Hau, a great Māori explorer. As he pursued his wife, who had left him for another lover, along the south west coast of the North Island, he came across and named river mouths, including Whanganui, Whangaehu and Rangitīkei according to events that befell him at the time. He then came across the mouth of the large, wide Manawatū River; in awe of the sight and in fear he might not be able to cross it, he said "Ka tū taku manawa" (My heart stands still).

The name Manawatū (often the Manawatu) also refers to the whole area centred on the Manawatū Plains, the floodplain of the Manawatū River, with Palmerston North as its principal city. Like some other areas of New Zealand such as Wairarapa and the King Country, the Manawatū in this sense has never had precisely defined boundaries, its extents determined largely by custom and preference. Always included are Palmerston North and all of today's Manawatū District, and usually included is that part of Horowhenua District lying north of Levin. Parts of Rangitikei and/or Tararua districts might also be included.

Demographics
Other towns and settlements include Halcombe, Himatangi Beach, Kimbolton, Pohangina, Rongotea, Sanson, and Tangimoana.

Manawatu District had a population of 30,165 at the 2018 New Zealand census, an increase of 2,706 people (9.9%) since the 2013 census, and an increase of 4,095 people (15.7%) since the 2006 census. There were 11,193 households. There were 14,943 males and 15,222 females, giving a sex ratio of 0.98 males per female. The median age was 41.3 years (compared with 37.4 years nationally), with 6,282 people (20.8%) aged under 15 years, 5,004 (16.6%) aged 15 to 29, 13,473 (44.7%) aged 30 to 64, and 5,406 (17.9%) aged 65 or older.

Ethnicities were 89.2% European/Pākehā, 16.5% Māori, 2.0% Pacific peoples, 2.6% Asian, and 2.0% other ethnicities. People may identify with more than one ethnicity.

The percentage of people born overseas was 10.6, compared with 27.1% nationally.

Although some people objected to giving their religion, 52.4% had no religion, 35.4% were Christian, 0.4% were Hindu, 0.2% were Muslim, 0.3% were Buddhist and 2.7% had other religions.

Of those at least 15 years old, 3,657 (15.3%) people had a bachelor or higher degree, and 5,595 (23.4%) people had no formal qualifications. The median income was $32,400, compared with $31,800 nationally. 3,549 people (14.9%) earned over $70,000 compared to 17.2% nationally. The employment status of those at least 15 was that 12,321 (51.6%) people were employed full-time, 3,498 (14.6%) were part-time, and 726 (3.0%) were unemployed.

Local government

Manawatu County Council
Manawatu County Council was one of 63 county councils that were formed in 1876 when the provinces were abolished. It originally extended from Rangiwahia in the north to Waikanae in the south. Over the 12 years to 1888, The towns of Palmerston North, Feilding and Foxton split off to form borough councils. The northern half of Manawatu County split off to form Oroua County Council in 1883. The area south of the Manawatū River split off to form Horowhenua County Council in 1884.

Manawatū District Council
Manawatu District Council was formed in 1988 when Manawatu County Council amalgamated with Kairanga County Council, itself a splinter of Oroua County Council. The following year, Manawatu District amalgamated with Feilding Borough, Kiwitea County, Oroua County and Pohangina County in the 1989 local government reforms.

For the purposes of representation, Manawatū District is divided into two wards:

In 2021, the council decided to establish a Māori ward from the 2022 local election.

The council is responsible for day-to-day administration and services:
 Animal control
 Bylaws
 Cemeteries
 Community grants and funding
 Infrastructure such as roads, drains, rubbish collection
 Library services
 Liquor licensing
 Property profiling

Deputy Mayor Matt Bell was then acting mayor until a by-election held on 7 March 2012. The by-election was narrowly won by Margaret Kouvelis from Feilding, who beat councillor Steven Gibson by just 14 votes (3293 votes to 3279). Helen Worboys won the mayoralty from the incumbent Margaret Kouvelis in the 2016 Local Government elections.

Horizons Regional Council
Manawatū District is in the Manawatū-Whanganui Region, which is governed by the Horizons Regional Council. For electoral and representation purposes, the district is divided into:

 Horowhenua-Kairanga Ward: rural area south of Feilding, including the entire Horowhenua District.
 Manawatū-Rangitikei Ward: Feilding and rural area to the north, and including the entire Rangitikei District.

Tourism

The Manawatū district includes both plains and hills, and is visited by cyclists and others for the views of the Central North Island volcanoes on clear days. The western coast has swimming beaches and large sand dunes, while the Ruahine Ranges in the east has walking tracks and views over the district from the Wharite mountain or from the Saddle Road.

In the middle of the district is Feilding, with its saleyards, equestrian and motorsport venue (Manfeild), boutique shopping and historical landmarks and collections.

The Royal New Zealand Air Force's main base, RNZAF Base Ohakea, is in Manawatū.

Schools

Secondary:
 Feilding High School, Feilding
 Hato Paora College, Cheltenham

References

Further reading
Davies, D. A. & Clevely, R. E. (1981) Pioneering to prosperity 1874–1974: a centennial history of the Manchester Block. Feilding: Fisher Printing. 
Holcroft, M. H. (1977) The line of the road: a history of Manawatu County, 1876–1976. Palmerston North: Manawatu County Council.
Knight, Catherine (2014) Ravaged Beauty: An Environmental History of the Manawatu. Auckland: Dunmore Press.

External links

Manawatū District Council
History, Manawatū District Council
Manawatū and Horowhenua, Te Ara – the Encyclopedia of New Zealand
Manawatu & City Business Directory

 
Districts of New Zealand